This is a list of seasons played by Dover Athletic F.C. in English football, from the club's formation to the most recent completed season. It details the club's achievements in all major and some minor competitions, and the top scorers for each season where known.

Dover Athletic F.C. was formed in 1983 after the dissolution of the town's previous club, Dover F.C., whose place in the Southern League was taken by the new club.  In the 1989–90 season Dover Athletic won the Southern League championship, but failed to gain promotion to the Football Conference due to ground grading issues.  Three seasons later the team won this title again and this time gained promotion to the Conference, where they spent nine seasons before being relegated.

The club's best performance in the FA Cup was an appearance in the Third Round proper in both the 2010–11 and the 2014–15 season, while the best performance registered in the FA Trophy, the national competition for higher-level non-league clubs, was a run to the semi-finals in the 1997–98 season.

Seasons

Key

Division shown in bold when it changes due to promotion, relegation or league reorganisation.

Key to league record
P – games played
W – games won
D – games drawn
L – games lost
F – goals for
A – goals against
Pts – points
Pos – final position

Key to rounds
Grp – group stage
R1Q – first qualifying round
R2Q – second qualifying round, etc.
RP – preliminary round
R1 – first round
R2 – second round, etc.
R1S – first round (south)
QF – quarter-final
SF – semi-final
n/a – not applicable

Key to divisions
Conf/ConfP/Natl – National League (known as Football Conference until 2004 and Conference Premier 2004–2016)
ConfS – Conference South
IsP – Isthmian League Premier Division
Is1 – Isthmian League First Division
Is1S – Isthmian League Division One South
SLP – Southern League Premier Division
SLS – Southern League Southern Division

Key to cups
CLC – Conference League Cup
EFC – Eastern Floodlit Cup
FLT – Football League Trophy
ILC – Isthmian League Cup
KSC – Kent Senior Cup
SLC – Southern League Cup

Footnotes

References

Dover Athletic
Seasons